Stephanie Chambers (born 9 March 1971) is an English actress, born in Birmingham, Warwickshire. She is known for playing Gabby Parr in the British soap Brookside, but has also appeared in New Tricks, Doctors, Emmerdale and the American horror film Seed of Chucky. Chambers trained at the Academy of Live and Recorded Arts in London.

She is engaged to Brookside co-star Steven Pinder and they have a daughter Scarlett Rose.

External links

From Seed of Chucky

English film actresses
English television actresses
Living people
Actresses from Birmingham, West Midlands
1971 births
Alumni of the Academy of Live and Recorded Arts